The list of Olympic men's ice hockey players for Japan consisted of 90 skaters and 9 goaltenders. Men's ice hockey tournaments have been staged at the Olympic Games since 1920 (it was introduced at the 1920 Summer Olympics, and was permanently added to the Winter Olympic Games in 1924). Japan has participated in eight tournaments, the first in 1936 and the most recent in 1998. Japan's best finish is eighth overall, at the 1960 Winter Olympics, while their lowest finish was thirteenth place in 1998.

Koji Iwamoto has scored the most points, 20, and points, 16, while Masahiro Sato has the most goals, with 13; Koji Iwamoto and Akiyoshi Segawa are tied for the most assists, with 8 each. Eleven players have appeared in three Olympics, the most by a Japanese player; one of them, Mamoru Takashima, played in 19 games, the most of any player.

One player, Shoichi Tomita, has been inducted into the International Ice Hockey Federation Hall of Fame, though as a builder and not for his playing career.



Key

Goaltenders

Skaters

References

Bibliography

 
 
 
 
 

ice hockey
Japan
Japan